Progressive ankylosis protein homolog (ANK ilosis H omolog) is a protein that in humans is encoded by the ANKH gene.

This gene encodes a multipass transmembrane protein that is expressed in joints and other tissues and controls pyrophosphate levels in cultured cells. Mutation at the mouse 'progressive ankylosis' (ank) locus causes a generalized, progressive form of arthritis accompanied by mineral deposition, formation of bony outgrowths, and joint destruction. The human homolog is virtually identical to the mouse protein and ANKH-mediated control of pyrophosphate levels has been suggested as a possible mechanism regulating tissue calcification and susceptibility to arthritis in higher animals.

References

External links
GeneReviews/NCBI/NIH/UW entry on Craniometaphyseal Dysplasia

Further reading